Balaram Hari (1825 –1890;( Bengali:  1232 and 30 Agrayan 1297) was a prominent Bengali  saint, religious leader, songwriter, social reformer in Bengal of British India. He established the Balarami sect, also known as Balaram Bhaja or Balahadi sect. The ideal of the Balarami is to lead a pure and simple life, above greed and sensuality. They consider praying to be their fundamental duty. They consider stealing and lying great sins. According to them, the universe is the body of God. Hindu disciples call their deity Hadi-Rama, while Muslim disciples use the term Hadi-Allah. Balahadis are still to be found at some places like Meherpur (now in Bangladesh), Nishchintapur in Nadia, Daikiari in Purulia, Shalunigram in Bankura etc.

Biography  

Balaram Hari was born on 1825 in Meherpur, Nadia Bengal Presidency, British India (present-day Meherpur District, Bangladesh) to the family of Gobinda Hari and Gormoni. He was in his youth employed as a watchman in the service of a local family of zemindars, and being very cruelly treated for alleged neglect of duty he severed his connection with them. After wandering about for some years, he became a religious teacher. Balaram Hari won about twenty thousand followers among the low-caste population and Muslims and it became Balarami sect.

He had a power of inventing puns though he was quite illiterate.  By which he could astonish his audience whenever he talked or debated.

Balaram Hari died in Meherpur, Nadia Bengal Presidency, British India (present-day Meherpur District, Bangladesh) Nadia on 1890 at the age of 65 years (Bengali:  30 Agrahayan 1297).

Philosophy

The philosophy of the Balarami sect he established is one of a pure, simple life above greed and sensuality. He was the against the caste system of Hinduism, especially that of the Brahmans. The sect was against idolatry. Certain common attributes of the religions like preachers or ‘gurus’, avatar was not present in his Balarami sect. The followers of Bala Hari have no peculiar sect marks or uniform.  According to the Balaram Hari, the human body is made with eighteen attributes. Balaram Hari won about twenty thousand followers among the local low-caste or outcaste populations and muslims. Some members, who were itinerant, lived on alms. The Balaramis are still to be found at some places like Meherpur of Bangladesh and Nishchintapur, Shabenagar, Palishipara, Natna, Hawlia, Arshinagor, Goribpur in Nadia, Daikiari in Purulia, and Shalunigram in Bankura  of India. Some of his notable disciples include Bindabon, Tanu, Ramchandra, Jaldhar, Raju fakir, and Shimanto and his songs include "dibojuge je hariram / meherpure tar nitodham", "ra’ sobdhe prithibi bojhai/ ‘m’ shobde joiber asray", and "hariramtratho nigur artho bedbedanto chhara/ kore sorbo dhormo projato sei peyeche dhora".

A subsect of Balahari light lamps and candles in the evening at his death place. Some members of the sect are known to celebrate Holi festivals however there is no such kind rules in Balahari religion.

References 

Bhakti movement
Bengali philosophers
Bengali Hindu saints
People from Nadia district
1825 births
1890 deaths
People from Meherpur District
Musicians from West Bengal